"Always You" is a pop song recorded by American singer Jennifer Paige. It was released in July 1999 as the third single released from her debut studio album Jennifer Paige. The song was written by Andy Goldmark and  J.D. Martin. For this single, Always You was remixed by Groove Brothers. The B-side is replayed by Mick Guzauski. "Always You" reached number six on the Billboard Dance/Club Play chart.

Track listing

 CD single
 Always You (Radio Mix) (Groove Brothers Remix) — 3:42
 Always You (The Ballad Mix) — 4:10

 CD maxi
 Always You (Radio Mix) (Groove Brothers Remix) — 3:42
 Always You (The Ballad Mix) — 4:10
 Always You (The Hex Mix) — 3:58
 Always You (Instrumental) — 3:37

Music video
The music video was released by Markus Nagel. This music video tells about a man who played a VHS. In this VHS, he's seeing Jennifer who's filming her trip journey between desert, boat travel etc... Later on joined by her boyfriend, the man who sees the movie.

Remixes and others versions
This song was remixed in a clubbing style by Hex Hector.
The original version and the remix of strobe were available only in the first studio album of Jennifer Paige. The version of Mick Guzauski is also available in cd and maxi single.

Charts

References

1999 singles
Jennifer Paige songs
Songs written by Andy Goldmark
1999 songs
Hollywood Records singles
Songs written by J. D. Martin (songwriter)